Yugra Arena is an indoor sporting arena located in Khanty-Mansiysk, Russia. It is used for various indoor events and is the home arena of the ice hockey team Yugra Khanty-Mansiysk which plays in the Kontinental Hockey League (previously it played in Russian Major League and lower leagues). The capacity of the arena is 5,500 spectators.

External links
Venue information

Indoor ice hockey venues in Russia
Indoor arenas in Russia
Sport in Khanty-Mansiysk
HC Yugra
Kontinental Hockey League venues
Sports venues completed in 2008
2008 establishments in Russia